Further Conversations with Myself is a 1967 album by jazz pianist Bill Evans. All the pieces are solo with piano overdubs, a method Evans used on his earlier release Conversations with Myself. It was reissued on CD by Verve in 1999.

Reception

Writing for Allmusic, music critic Scott Yanow called the album "A thoughtful and (despite the overdubbing) spontaneous sounding set of melodic music."

Track listing
"Emily" (Johnny Mandel, Johnny Mercer) - 4:56
"Yesterdays" (Otto Harbach, Jerome Kern) - 3:50
"Santa Claus Is Coming to Town" (J. Fred Coots, Haven Gillespie) - 3:47
"Funny Man" (Bill Evans) - 3:45
"The Shadow of Your Smile (Love Theme from "The Sandpiper")" (Mandel, Paul Francis Webster) - 8:03
"Little Lulu" (Buddy Kaye, Sidney Lippman, Fred Wise) - 2:50
"Quiet Now" (Denny Zeitlin) - 7:53

Credits
Bill Evans - piano
Ray Hall - engineer

References

External links
Jazz Discography entries for Bill Evans
Bill Evans Memorial Library discography

1967 albums
Verve Records albums
Bill Evans albums